Established in 1974, ECRE is a European network of 105 NGOs in 39 European countries. 

In 2011, the council raised concerns regarding planned repatriations of Afghan asylum children.

In 2014, the council was critical of EU cutbacks of migrant rescue operations in the Mediterranean.

References

External links
 ECRE Official Site
 Refugee Stories Project

Refugee aid organizations in Europe
Human rights organisations based in Belgium
European migrant crisis